Brian Smith (born August 9, 1980) is an American football coach who is currently the passing game coordinator and running backs coach at Ohio University. He was previously the associate head coach and offensive coordinator at the University of Hawaii, where he also played college football.

Playing career 
Smith played center at Hawaii from 1998 to 2001. He was also the team's starting long snapper in that same time duration. He was the college roommate of Nick Rolovich, and the two would practice long snaps in their apartment hallway. Following his playing career at Hawaii, Smith signed professional contracts with the Green Bay Packers and Baltimore Ravens in 2002 and 2003, respectively.

Coaching career 
After spending one year coaching the offensive line at Royal High School in Simi Valley, California, Smith joined the coaching staff at Hawaii as a student assistant while he completed his bachelor's degree. He also spent time as an assistant at Cal Lutheran, Oregon State, and Portland State.

Second stint at Hawaii 
Smith was hired to be the offensive line coach at Hawaii in 2008 on Greg McMackin's inaugural staff, before shifting to coaching running backs in 2009. Smith was not retained by newly hired head coach Norm Chow for the 2012 season.

Return to Cal Lutheran and Occidental College 
Smith spent 2012 as the offensive line coach at Cal Lutheran, and was hired to be the offensive coordinator and offensive line coach at Occidental College in 2013.

Third stint at Hawaii 
Smith joined the Hawaii coaching staff for the third time in his coaching career, this time under his college roommate Rolovich and as the associate head coach and offensive coordinator. He was also the team's running backs coach the entire duration of his stint, while also working as the tight ends coach in 2017 before the position was vacated in 2018 due to the change in offensive scheme from spread option to run and shoot.

Washington State 
After Rolovich departed Hawaii to be the next head coach at Washington State, Smith was considered by the public eye to be a possible successor to Rolovich at Hawaii before Todd Graham was named the Rainbow Warriors head coach a couple of weeks later. Smith was then officially added to Rolovich's coaching staff as the offensive coordinator & running backs coach. He added the title of associate head coach in 2021.

Ohio 
Smith was named the passing game coordinator and running backs coach at Ohio in 2022. In his first season with the Bobcats Smith coached running back Sieh Bangura to Freshman All-American honors and MAC Freshman of the Year honors while improving the Ohio passing attack to 23rd nationally, up from 108th in previous season.

References

External links 
Washington State bio
Hawaii bio
Hawaii player bio

1980 births
Living people
People from Thousand Oaks, California
American football centers
American football long snappers
Hawaii Rainbow Warriors football players
Green Bay Packers players
Baltimore Ravens players
High school football coaches in California
Hawaii Rainbow Warriors football coaches
Cal Lutheran Kingsmen football coaches
Oregon State Beavers football coaches
Portland State Vikings football coaches
Occidental Tigers football coaches
Washington State Cougars football coaches
Ohio Bobcats football coaches